Tavi Gevinson (born April 21, 1996) is an American actress, writer, and magazine editor. She came to public attention at the age of 12 due to her fashion blog Style Rookie. By the age of 15, she had shifted her focus to pop culture and feminist discussion. She started to take acting roles regularly beginning in 2013, and currently stars in the rebooted version of HBO's Gossip Girl.

Gevinson was the founder and editor-in-chief of the online magazine Rookie, aimed primarily at teenage girls.

Early life
Gevinson was born in Chicago, Illinois, and raised in the suburban town of Oak Park, Illinois. Her father, Steve Gevinson, is an English high school teacher. Her mother, Berit Engen, is a weaver and part-time Hebrew instructor who grew up in Oslo, Norway. Gevinson's father was born to an Orthodox Jewish family; her mother, who was raised Lutheran, converted to Judaism in 2001. Gevinson and her two older sisters, Rivkah and Miriam, were raised in the Jewish faith; she had a Bat Mitzvah ceremony. Gevinson was educated at Oak Park and River Forest High School in her hometown Oak Park.

Career

2008–2011: Style Rookie
Gevinson started a fashion blog, Style Rookie, in 2008. The blog, featuring photos of the 11-year-old in distinctive outfits and her commentary on the latest fashion trends, began drawing nearly 30,000 readers each day. Her father "wasn't terribly interested" in her new hobby until she asked for his permission to be interviewed by The New York Times for an article about young bloggers.

Because of the blog's success, Gevinson was invited to attend New York Fashion Week and Paris Fashion Week. She made overseas fashion-related trips to Tokyo and Antwerp, funded by Pop magazine, and was commissioned to write articles for Harper's Bazaar and Barneys.com. She styled a shoot for BlackBook magazine, acted as a muse and model for Rodarte's clothing line at Target stores, and partnered with Borders&Frontiers to design and sell her own T-shirt. In 2010, she spoke at a marketing conference in New York and at Idea City, a Canadian version of the TED conference.

There was a backlash to Gevinson's early success in the fashion industry. New York magazine questioned whether it was possible for Gevinson to write her blog without "some help from a mom or older sister". Sarah Mower of The Daily Telegraph, while conceding that Gevinson had a "truly independent, original voice", criticized her father for taking her out of school "to go to haute couture shows ... It's hard to imagine a kid being able to come back down to reality." A Grazia fashion editor complained on Twitter that a large bow Gevinson wore had blocked her view of a runway during fashion week. Anne Slowey of Elle felt her success was "gimmicky" and commented, "She's been thirteen for, like, the last four years." Gevinson later remarked: "A lot of people on the Internet have a problem with a young person doing well. I felt like there were people who were [at fashion week] because of their name, their money or their family, and I didn't have any of those things."

2011–present: Rookie, acting roles, etc.
In early 2011, Gevinson decided to stop writing primarily about fashion: "Lately I've been looking to other places for a creative outlet and for inspiration ... Now I'm more intrigued by mixing fashion with the other stuff I've been enjoying." Her personal style also became less outlandish: "Before, dressing up was my outlet, and now I'm pursuing other creative things that take up a lot of time and energy, so in the morning I usually want to put on something simple and comfortable."

In the fall of 2011, at the age of 15, Gevinson founded Rookie magazine. The site was originally conceived of as a joint venture with Jane Pratt, but Gevinson ultimately decided to maintain sole ownership. Ira Glass acted as a mentor figure to Gevinson. The website focused on issues impacting teenage girls and was written mainly by teenage girls. It also featured guest contributors. A one-off print edition of the magazine, Rookie Yearbook One, was published by Drawn & Quarterly in 2012. In 2012, Gevinson spoke at TEDxTeen, with a focus on representation of women in popular culture, and at The Economist'''s World in 2012 Festival. She is also a contributing editor at Garage magazine. In November 2018, Gevinson announced that she was shutting down Rookie due to its no longer being financially sustainable.

Gevinson first acted in a short film, First Bass, in 2008, but became more visible in 2012. That year, she voiced a character in the animated short film Cadavar, which was directed by First Bass's Jonah Ansell and co-starred Kathy Bates and Christopher Lloyd. In the film, she sang renditions of both Neil Young and Pet Shop Boys songs. Also in 2012, Gevinson filmed a role in Enough Said by director Nicole Holofcener. Gevinson is interviewed on screen in the 2013 documentary film The Punk Singer, talking about riot grrrl punk icon Kathleen Hanna. In 2014 and 2015, she starred in This Is Our Youth in Chicago and at the Cort Theatre on Broadway. In 2015, she made a guest appearance as Feather McCarthy on "Beware of Young Girls", the seventh episode of the American comedy horror television series Scream Queens. She played Mary Warren in Ivo van Hove's 2016 production of The Crucible at the Walter Kerr Theatre. Later that year, she played Anya in The Cherry Orchard at the American Airlines Theatre.

On the MSNBC chat show So Popular!, host Janet Mock dubbed Gevinson the "Queen of the Millennials". She then made a guest appearance on The Nightly Show with Larry Wilmore on a panel critiquing Sean Penn's Rolling Stone'' interview with El Chapo.

In 2016, Gevinson recorded a duet with Hunx and His Punx frontman Seth Bogart, singing on "Barely 21" from Bogart's self-titled debut solo album.

Acting credits

Film

Television

Theater

Politics 
During the 2012 U.S. presidential campaign, Gevinson supported Barack Obama, and appeared in a public service announcement for women's rights, mouthing the words to Lesley Gore's "You Don't Own Me". She organized a get-well-soon-card drive for Malala Yousafzai, the 14-year-old Pakistani girl whose campaigning for education rights led to her shooting in October 2012.

References

Further reading

External links

 

The New York Times profile

1996 births
Living people
21st-century American non-fiction writers
Actors from Oak Park, Illinois
American bloggers
American fashion journalists
American feminist writers
American people of Norwegian descent
American women bloggers
American women journalists
Jewish American writers
Jewish feminists
The New Yorker people
Writers from Oak Park, Illinois
21st-century American women writers
21st-century American Jews